Portuguese Ceylon (Sinhala: පෘතුගීසි ලංකාව Puruthugisi Lankawa, Tamil: போர்த்துக்கேய இலங்கை Porthukeya Ilankai) is the name given to the territory on Ceylon, modern-day Sri Lanka, controlled by the Portuguese Empire between 1597 and 1658.

Portuguese presence in the island lasted from 1505 to 1658. Their arrival was largely accidental, and the Portuguese sought control of commerce, rather than territory. The Portuguese were later drawn into the internal politics of the island with the political upheaval of the Wijayaba Kollaya, and used these internal divisions to their advantage during the Sinhalese–Portuguese War, first in an attempt to control the production of valuable cinnamon and later of the entire island. Direct Portuguese rule did not begin until after the death of Dharmapala of Kotte, who died without an heir, and had bequeathed the Kingdom of Kotte to the Portuguese monarch in 1580. That allowed the Portuguese sufficient claim to the Kingdom of Kotte upon Dharmapala's death in 1597. Portuguese rule began with much resistance by the local population.

Eventually, the Kingdom of Kandy sought help from the Dutch East India Company, with whom they initially entered into agreement. After the collapse of the Iberian economy in 1627, the Dutch–Portuguese War saw the Dutch conquest of most of Portugal's Asian colonies – Ceylon included, between 1638 and 1658. Nevertheless, elements of Portuguese culture from this colonial period remain in Sri Lanka.

History

Arrival and establishment of the Portuguese (1505–1543)

Portuguese knew Sri Lanka by the name ''Seylan''. In 1505 King of Portugal instructed General Dom Francisco de Almeida to find the island of ''Seylan'' when he was appointed as the emperor of the East by the Portuguese. When the Portuguese were trying to establish relations with Ceylon, Dom Lourenco de Almeida, son of Dom Francisco de Almeida, and others arrived by chance in 1505 AD. So, the first contact between Sri Lanka and the Portuguese was established by Dom Lourenço de Almeida in 1505. It was largely accidental and it wasn't until 12 years later that the Portuguese sought to establish a fortified trading settlement.

The Kingdom of Kotte as a Portuguese entrance (1543–1597)

Annexation of Kotte and war with Kandy (1597)

Direct Portuguese rule began after the death of Dharmapala of Kotte who bequeathed the Kingdom of Kotte to the Portuguese monarch. By 1600 the Portuguese had consolidated the main centers of rebellion, the Kelani and Kalu ganga basins, leaving the border regions to Sinhalese resistance.

Conquest of Jaffna (1619)

Dutch conquest (1638–1658)

Political cities and their kings in srilanka when the arival of portugese

Administration

Administrative structure

Administrative divisions

Taxation

Military

Demographics and ethnicities

Economy 
Cinnamon and black pepper were main spices exported by Portuguese.

Legacy

Food 

There are many foods of Portuguese influence that are still popular in Sri Lanka. For example, lingus and pastries.

Language 

Sinhala words for certain types of Western attire/ furniture/ food & drink are derived from the Portuguese. Some examples are below:

See also 
 Portuguese India
 Dutch Ceylon
 British Ceylon
 Sinhalese%E2%80%93Portuguese War

References 

 
C. Gaston Pereira, Kandy fights the Portuguese. Sri Lanka: Vijitha Yapa Publications, July 2007. 
Channa Wicremasekera, Kandy at War. Sri Lanka: Vijitha Yapa Publications, 2004. 
Michael Roberts, Sinhala Consciousness in the Kandyan Period. Sri Lanka: Vijitha Yapa Publications, 2004. ,

 Senaka Weeraratna, Repression of Buddhism in Sri Lanka by the Portuguese (1505 - 1658)

External links 
 Ceylon and the Portuguese, 1505–1658, y Paulus Edward Pieris (American Ceylon Mission Press, 1920)
 Portuguese History in Ceylon

 
Kingdom of Kotte
Former Portuguese colonies
Former countries in South Asia
States and territories established in 1597
States and territories disestablished in 1658
1597 establishments in Asia
1658 disestablishments in Asia
16th-century establishments in Sri Lanka
17th-century disestablishments in Sri Lanka
1597 establishments in the Portuguese Empire
1658 disestablishments in the Portuguese Empire
Transitional period of Sri Lanka